The West Allis Speedskating Club (WASSC) is a short track speed skating club located in West Allis, Wisconsin. Founded in 1930, it is a nonprofit organization that runs under and as part of the West Allis/West Milwaukee Department of Recreation. The club trains on the Pettit National Ice Center, at the State Fair grounds, which houses a  indoor speed skating oval and two Olympic-size ice rinks.

Members of the club, both novice and advanced, compete in short track speed skating competitions in various parts of the United States, such as the Great Lakes region.

For over 70 years, the WASSC has developed top US speedskaters claiming over 17 Olympians, more than 50 World Team members and over 95 National Champions.

List of Olympians

References

External links
 

Speed skating clubs
Sports clubs established in 1930
West Allis, Wisconsin